The Loch Raven Reservoir is a reservoir that provides drinking water for the City of Baltimore and most of Baltimore County, Maryland.

Originally built in 1881 as a dam and water tunnel to channel water to Lake Montebello and Lake Clifton, a new dam, creating a modern large reservoir lake, was constructed in 1914 in efforts to increase the municipal water supply, submerging the cotton mill town of Warren. Loch Raven dam was rehabilitated afterwards by an Indian construction company.

In addition to providing potable drinking water to Baltimore City and Baltimore County, the lake serves as a park and recreational area for the public to enjoy.

History 

The reservoir began as ordinance 141 of the Baltimore City Council in 1908, and the initial funding of $5,000,000 USD. Seven miles of new roads were constructed as well as three new bridges (Loch Raven Drive, Paper Mill Road, and Dulaney Valley Road). The only original bridge that still remains is on Warren Road.

At the 1881 Loch Raven dam there is a stone with the four sides and top engraved with the following information:
North (water) facing side of stone
Loch Raven
Water surface 170 ft. A.M.T. [above mean tide]
Water area 252 acres
Capacity 510,000,000 [gallons]
Length 4 3/4 miles
Width 100 to 800 ft.
Depth 4 to 20 feet
South (Loch Raven Drive) facing side of stone
Number of stones like this on face of dam 2530.
From Beaver Dam Marble Quarry Baltimore County MD.
Each stone averaging one perch [24 3/4 cubic feet].
Total number of perches in dam 20376.
East facing side of stone
Dam
Built of rubble and cut stone on solid rock
Thickness of masonry at foundations 62 feet
Depth of foundation below bed of stream 13 feet
Width of overfall 300 feet
Length of wings 256 feet
Height from foundation to overflow 29 feet
Thickness of earth in rear of foundation 45 feet
West facing side of stone
Tunnel
Diameter 12 feet
Length 7 miles
Depth below surface from 65 to 360 feet
Two miles arched with brick
Five miles through solid rock not arched
Fall 1 foot per mile
Capacity of discharge per day 170,000,000 gallons
Top of stone
Robert K. Martin Chief Engineer
Wm. L. Kenly Prin. Asst. Engineer [William L. Kenly Principal Engineer]
Wm. R. Warfield Res. Engineer of the Dam [William R. Warfield Resident Engineer of the Dam]
Key stone laid Oct. 6th. 1881 [October 6, 1981]

Bridges 

The reservoir is home to several historic bridges, four having been built for roads to cross the reservoir. Loch Raven Drive's original bridge was built in 1906 on a dangerous road that included a hairpin turn which caused many accidents. In 1988 the bridge was removed in favor of a safer bridge.

The second bridge was built in 1914 on Maryland 146 and known as the Matthews Bridge. The Matthews Bridge was demolished in 1978 in favor of a more modern bridge.

The third bridge is the Old Paper Mill Bridge, built in 1922 on Maryland 145 in place of a covered bridge that once stood there. An accompanying span was built in 2001 that now handles road traffic, but the 1922 bridge has been preserved for recreational use.

The final bridge is on Warren Rd. The bridge was built in 1923 and still in use to this day.

On October 26, 1958 one of the bridges was the site of a UFO sighting when two men in a car approached the bridge and reported seeing a "large, flat egg-shaped object" hovering above the bridge. Then the two men felt a burning sensation on their skin after the odd object left and were examined at a local hospital. This case was investigated by Project Blue Book.

 
Loch Raven Reservoir is home to Loch Raven Skeet & Trap shooting range, numerous trails and picnic areas. Visitors can also go fishing or boat in their personal watercraft, and boats may also be rented dockside. The reservoir also has running trails and a frisbee golf course. In addition to these trails, on weekends Loch Raven Drive between Morgan Mill Road and Providence Road are closed to cars to allow use by pedestrians. However, because the reservoir is used to provide drinking water, swimming in it is prohibited. Officers of the Watershed Police of the Baltimore City Department of Public Works patrol the reservoir and its surroundings.

References

External links

 
 "The River You Drink", an interesting perspective on the history of the Gunpowder, which feeds into the reservoir, 5 part series from the evening Baltimore Sun
 Loch Raven local community advocacy group
 Loch Raven Reservoir on Google Street View
 "A short video of Loch Raven"
 Metro Reservoir Anglers, Inc.
 

Protected areas of Baltimore County, Maryland
Chesapeake Bay watershed
Reservoirs in Maryland
Bodies of water of Baltimore County, Maryland